Uzbekistan participated at the 2018 Summer Youth Olympics in Buenos Aires, Argentina from 6 October to 18 October 2018.

Competitors

Athletics

Boxing

Boys

Girls

Canoeing

Uzbekistan qualified three boats based on its performance at the 2018 World Qualification Event.

 Boys' C1 - 1 boat
 Boys' K1 - 1 boat
 Girls' C1 - 1 boat

Equestrian

Uzbekistan qualified a rider based on its ranking in the FEI World Jumping Challenge Rankings.

 Individual Jumping - 1 athlete

Summary

Gymnastics

Acrobatic
Uzbekistan qualified a mixed pair based on its performance at the 2018 Acrobatic Gymnastics World Championship.

 Mixed pair - 1 team of 2 athletes

Artistic
Uzbekistan qualified two gymnasts based on its performance at the 2018 Asian Junior Championship.

 Boys' artistic individual all-around - 1 quota
 Girls' artistic individual all-around - 1 quota

Rhythmic
Uzbekistan qualified one gymnast based on its performance at the 2018 Asian Junior Championship.

 Girls' rhythmic individual all-around - 1 quota

Trampoline
Uzbekistan qualified one gymnast based on its performance at the 2018 Asian Junior Championship.

 Boys' trampoline - 1 quota

Judo

Individual

Team

Karate

Uzbekistan qualified one athlete based on its performance at one of the Karate Qualification Tournaments.

 Girls' -53kg - Dildora Alikulova

Rowing

Uzbekistan qualified one boys' boat based on its performance at the 2017 World Junior Rowing Championships. They also qualified one girls' boat based on its performance at the 2018 Asian Youth Olympic Games Qualification Regatta.

 Boys' pair – 2 athletes
 Girls' single sculls - 1 athlete

Shooting

Team

Swimming

Taekwondo

Weightlifting

Uzbekistan qualified three athletes based on its performance at the 2017 World Youth Championships.

Boys

Girls

Supatchanin Khamhaeng from Thailand was disqualified after testing positive for a banned substance. She was stripped of her gold medal and Dolera Davronova got the silver medal instead of the bronze medal.

Wrestling

Key:
  – Victory by Fall
  – Without any points scored by the opponent
  – With point(s) scored by the opponent
  – Without any points scored by the opponent
  – With point(s) scored by the opponent

Boys

Girls

References

External links
NOC Schedule

2018 in Uzbekistani sport
Nations at the 2018 Summer Youth Olympics
Uzbekistan at the Youth Olympics